Jeffrey Michael Quinney (born November 17, 1978) is an American professional golfer.

Quinney was born in Eugene, Oregon. He had a successful amateur career, winning the U.S. Amateur in 2000, and represented the USA in the Walker Cup in 2001.

After turning professional in 2001 he played on the Canadian Tour and Nationwide Tour, and won the Oregon Classic in 2004. He finished in the top 10 of the Nationwide Tour Order of Merit in 2006, enabling him to play on the PGA Tour in 2007.

Quinney made a strong start in his rookie season, earning four top-ten finishes in his first five events.  This run of good form propelled him into the top 100 of the Official World Golf Rankings.

In May 2008 he reached the top 50 of the world rankings after finishing third at The Players Championship.

Quinney was named the assistant coach of the University of Oregon men's golf team in 2021. He became the school's interim head coach in October after Casey Martin had his leg amputated.

Amateur wins
1998 Pacific Northwest Amateur
2000 U.S. Amateur, Pacific Northwest Amateur

Professional wins (3)

Nationwide Tour wins (1)

Nationwide Tour playoff record (0–1)

Canadian Tour wins (2)
2002 Scottsdale Swing at McCormick Ranch, Bay Mills Open

Results in major championships

CUT = missed the half-way cut
"T" = tied

Results in The Players Championship

CUT = missed the halfway cut
"T" indicates a tie for a place

U.S. national team appearances
Amateur
Eisenhower Trophy: 2000 (winners)
Palmer Cup: 2001 (winners)
Walker Cup: 2001

See also
2006 Nationwide Tour graduates

References

External links

American male golfers
Arizona State Sun Devils men's golfers
PGA Tour golfers
Korn Ferry Tour graduates
Golfers from Oregon
Golfers from Scottsdale, Arizona
Sportspeople from Eugene, Oregon
1978 births
Living people